The term Urmonotheismus (German for "primeval monotheism") or primitive monotheism expresses the hypothesis of a monotheistic Urreligion, from which polytheistic religions allegedly degenerated. This evolutionary view of religious development is diametrically opposed to another evolutionary view on the development of religious thought: the hypothesis that religion progressed from simple forms to complex: first pre-animism, then animism, totemism, polytheism, and finally monotheism.

History
In 1898, the Scottish anthropologist Andrew Lang proposed that the idea of a Supreme Being, the "high God", or "All Father" existed among some of the simplest of contemporary tribes prior to their contact with Western peoples, and that Urmonotheismus ("primitive monotheism") was the original religion of humankind.

Urmonotheismus was then defended by the Catholic priest  Wilhelm Schmidt (1868–1954) in his essay Der Ursprung der Gottesidee, published in 1912, opposing the "Revolutionary Monotheism" approach that traces the emergence of monotheistic thought as a gradual process spanning the Bronze and Iron Age religions of the ancient Near East and Classical antiquity. According to Schmidt, alleged traces of primitive monotheism could be recognized in the Assyro-Babylonian deities Ashur and Marduk, and the Ancient Hebrew god Yahweh. Monotheism in Schmidt's view is the "natural" form of theism, which was later overlaid and "degraded" by polytheism after the deceased ancestors became worshipped in primitive human societies, and personified natural forces became worshipped as well as divine beings.

A significant part of the Italian anthropologist and historian of religion Raffaele Pettazzoni's work on the study of ancient religions was devoted to refuting the speculative theory of "primordial monotheism" (Urmonotheismus) previously developed by Schmidt, and the study of the conceptions of the Supreme Being in so-called "primitive" religions. Schmidt believed to have found evidence of monotheism in tribal societies, and argued that all human societies recognize the Supreme Being as a non-exclusive spiritual entity which is paramount by also opposed by other spiritual entities. Pettazzoni challenged Schmidt's concept of a Supreme Being as necessarily entailing monotheism. Rather, Pettazzoni writes that monotheism is a recent religious development over the course of a slow revolution in polytheism and perhaps henotheism. In the Hebrew Bible, this debate is carried on by the narrations on the Old Testament prophets who wrangle with the Canaanite gods, which serve to re-affirm both the ethical monotheism of the Israelites in opposition to the Canaanite religion and their belief in one exclusive transcendent deity coexisting with lesser divine beings. (See also: God in Abrahamic religions).

Schmidt's hypothesis was controversially discussed during much of the first half of the 20th century. In the 1930s, Schmidt adduced evidence from Native American religion and mythology, Australian Aboriginal religion and mythology, and other primitive civilizations in support of his views. He also responded to his critics. For instance, he rejected Pettazzoni's claim that the sky gods were merely a dim personification or embodiment of the physical sky, writing in The Origin and Growth of Religion: "The outlines of the Supreme Being become dim only among later peoples". He adds that "a being who lives in the sky, who stands behind the celestial phenomena, who must 'centralize' in himself the various manifestations [of thunder, rain, etc.] is not a personification of the sky at all". According to Ernest Brandewie in Wilhelm Schmidt and the Origin of the Idea of God, Schmidt also claims that Pettazzoni fails to study Schmidt's work seriously and often relies on incorrect translations of Schmidt's German. Brandewie also says Pettazzoni's definition of primitive ethical monotheism is an "arbitrary" straw-man argument, but he says Schmidt went too far when he claimed that such ethical monotheism was the earliest religious idea.

According to Pettazzoni's analysis, Schmidt confused science and theology, as he writes in the booklet The supreme being in primitive religions (1957). For Pettazzoni, the idea of a god in primitive religions is not an a priori concept independent of historical contexts; there is only the historical context, and arises from varying existential conditions within each type of human society. It is only within that societal context that the idea of God can satisfy, hence the Supreme Being does not exist a priori. Therefore, one finds the Supreme Being defined variously as the one who sends the rain, the protector of the hunt, or even as a life-giver associated with the soil and harvest in agrarian societies—unique historical contexts that give rise to their own particular conception of the Supreme Being. Pettazzoni argues that religion must be conceived first and foremost as a historical product, conditioned by historical, cultural, and social contexts, with unique influence on other social and cultural realities within the same human society that produced it.

By the 1950s, the academic establishment had rejected the hypothesis of primitive ethical monotheism (but not per se other proposed versions of Urmonotheismus) so the proponents of Schmidt's "Vienna school" rephrased his ideas to the effect that while ancient cultures may not have known "true monotheism", they at least show evidence for "original theism" (Urtheismus, as opposed to non-theistic animism), with a concept of Hochgott ("High God", as opposed to Eingott "Single God") in effect henotheism which acknowledged the Supreme Being but also various lesser gods. Christian apologetics in the light of this have moved away from postulating a "memory of revelation" in pre-Christian religions, replacing it with an "inkling of redemption" or virtuous paganism unconsciously anticipating monotheism. That said, E. E. Evans-Pritchard noted in Theories of Primitive Religion, first published in 1962, that most anthropologists have abandoned all evolutionary schemes like Schmidt and Pettazzoni's for the historical development of religion, adding that they have also found monotheistic beliefs existing side-by-side with other religious beliefs.

See also
 Anthropology of religion
 Evolutionary origin of religions
 History of religion
 Prehistoric religion
 Deism
 Christian deism
 Deus otiosus
 Moralistic therapeutic deism
 Unmoved mover
 Ethical monotheism
 Fitra
 God gene
 Hanif
 Irreligion
 Agnostic theism
 Nontheism
 Theological noncognitivism
 Naturalistic pantheism
 Neuroscience of religion
 Nontheistic religion
 Psychology of religion
 Religious naturalism
 Spiritual naturalism
 The One (Neoplatonism)

Notes

Monotheism
Anthropology of religion